The Women's 100 metre breaststroke competition of the 2021 FINA World Swimming Championships (25 m) was held on 19 and 20 December 2021.

Records
Prior to the competition, the existing world and championship records were as follows.

Results

Heats
The heats were started on 19 December at 10:45.

Semifinals
The semifinals were started on 19 December at 19:48.

Final
The final was held on 20 December at 19:42.

References

Women's 100 metre breaststroke
2021 in women's swimming